Lapeyrouse may refer to:

Places 

Lapeyrouse is the name or part of the name of several communes in France:

 Lapeyrouse, Ain
 Lapeyrouse, Puy-de-Dôme
 Lapeyrouse-Fossat, in the Haute-Garonne département
 Lapeyrouse-Mornay, in the Drôme département

People

Stephen Lapeyrouse (b. 1952) is an American author, essayist, journalist and ELE public forum host in Moscow, Russia.